Statistics of J. League Cup, officially the '96 J.League Yamazaki Nabisco Cup, in the 1996 season.

Overview
It was contested by 16 teams, and Shimizu S-Pulse won the championship.

Results

Group A

Group B

Semifinals
Kashiwa Reysol 1–2 Verdy Kawasaki
Shimizu S-Pulse 5–0 Bellmare Hiratsuka

Final

Verdy Kawasaki 3–3 (PK 4–5) Shimizu S-Pulse
Shimizu S-Pulse won the cup

References
rsssf
 J. League

J.League Cup
Lea